The First of May (also known as Two for the Show) is a 1998 independent film by Paul Sirmons and Gary Rogers, starring Dan Byrd, Julie Harris, Charles Nelson Reilly, Robin O'Dell, Tom Nowicki, Joe DiMaggio, and Mickey Rooney. It premiered on 12th October, 1998, in Buena Vista, Florida, at the FMPTA Annual Party.  It is notable for being the last film in which Joe DiMaggio appeared.

Awards 
 Dove Award (issued by The Dove Foundation )
 Kidsfirst! Best of the Fest Award 
 Best of Fest Award (issued by the Chicago International Children's Film Festival ) 
 Best Film Award Feature Drama (issued by Burbank Film Festival )
 Best Film Awards Child Actor Performance (issued by Burbank Film Festival )
 Marcinek - Children's Jury Special Mention for  a Movie and Special Mention by Professional Jury for Julie Harris as Foreign Actor at 18th Ale Kino! International Young Audience Film Festival

References

External links 
 

1998 films
1990s English-language films